Potheri is a rapidly-growing village locality in the South suburbs of the Metropolitan city Chennai.  It is a town that comes under Maraimalai Nagar municipality of Chengalpattu taluk in the Chengalpattu district of Tamil Nadu, India and suburb of Chennai within Chennai Metropolitan Area. It is about 2.5 kilometers from Guduvancheri.The primary educational institutions located in Potheri are SRM Institute of Science and Technology and Valliammai Engineering College. 

The neighbourhood is served by the Potheri railway station Chengalpattu taluk to Chennai Suburban Railway Network.

The population of Potheri is primarily composed of students from the educational institutions located in Potheri. The socioeconomic status of the village almost entirely depends upon the SRM Institute of Science and Technology. Most of the population of Potheri live in apartment buildings.

Transportation
Potheri is located in the southern part of the Chennai city and is well-connected by roads and railways. The city is located along the National Highway-45 (NH-45) GST Road, Chennai Tambaram and Chengalpattu Kanchipuram district highway.

See also
 Guduvancheri at Chengalpattu region 
 Thailavaram at Chengalpattu region 
 Kattankulathur at Chengalpattu region

Suburbs of Chennai